Adriaan Koonings (23 December 1895 – 18 April 1963), was a Dutch footballer who was active as a striker.

Koonings was born in Rotterdam and played his whole career at Feijenoord.  He won one cap for the Netherlands. After his career he managed Feijenoord from 1946–1950, and he died in Rotterdam.

Honours
 1923-24 : Eredivisie winner with Feijenoord
 1927-28 : Eredivisie winner with Feijenoord
 1929-30 : KNVB Cup winner with Feijenoord

1895 births
1963 deaths
Dutch footballers
Dutch football managers
Feyenoord players
Feyenoord managers
Association football forwards
Footballers from Rotterdam
Netherlands international footballers